Community television in Australia is a form of free-to-air non-commercial citizen media in which a television station is owned, operated and/or programmed by a community group to provide local programming to its broadcast area. In principle, community television is another model of facilitating media production and involvement by private citizens and can be likened to public-access television in the United States and community television in Canada.

Each station is a not-for-profit entity and is subject to specific provisions of the Broadcasting Services Act 1992. A Code of Practice, registered with the Australian Communications and Media Authority, provides additional regulation of the sector. The community television stations operate independently so they are technically not a network (in the commonly held definition of the term). However, some programs are broadcast on multiple stations in the group, and they do co-operate with each other in various ways. The stations act collectively through the Australian Community Television Alliance.

"Channel 31" is the colloquial name for some metropolitan community-licensed television stations throughout Australia, with Adelaide Community Television known as Channel 44. The name originates from UHF 31, the frequency and channel number reserved for analogue broadcasts by metropolitan community television stations. By 2010, all stations were broadcasting in 576i standard definition on digital channel 44, since their analogue signals were switched off and replaced with digital.

History
In the early 1970s, the Australia Council worked together with various community groups to establish a number of video production centres that could be used to produce Australian television programs. Many people began using these production centres, as well as their own resources, to make television programs. It was still difficult for these programs to be screened on commercial or government-funded television. It has been suggested that this was because the programs were thought to be too short, long or different from the programs already showing.

Whilst community radio stations were quickly established around Australia, community television took longer to develop. During 1984, a Perth-based community group unsuccessfully applied for a community television licence. In the late 1980s in Alice Springs, Imparja Television (now a commercial station) was established. In 1987, RMITV was set up by students at RMIT University in Melbourne. This became the first community television station to receive a test transmission permit.

In 1992, the Australian Government asked the ABA to conduct a trial of community television using the vacant sixth television channel (UHF 31 in capital cities). Community television services have been provided on a trial basis since 1994 under the open narrowcast 'class licence'. These licences are issued on the condition that they are used only for community and educational non-profit purposes and are held by broadcasters in most Australian capital cities.

In 2002, the legislation was changed to introduce new community television licences and in 2004 the first licences were issued in Sydney, Perth, Melbourne and Brisbane.

Decline
In September 2014, then Minister for Communications Malcolm Turnbull announced that all community television licences would end in December 2015. Just a week before becoming Prime Minister in September 2015, Turnbull amended the deadline by one year, to 31 December 2016. However, Television Sydney later ceased broadcasting on 20 December 2015. The other stations in Melbourne, Brisbane, Adelaide and Perth had already started their shift to online services, but remained broadcasting.

The deadline was extended a number of times at the last minute by Minister for Communications Mitch Fifield, first to 30 June 2017, and later to 31 December 2017. An additional extension to 30 June 2018 was made as part of the government's deal with the Nick Xenophon Team to garner support for large-scale media reforms in the Senate. However, by that point, 31 Digital had already ceased broadcasting on 27 February. A further extension, announced on 1 June 2018, gave broadcasters an additional two years through 30 June 2020.

On the deadline date of 31 June 2020, following further negotiations with the two remaining community stations Channel 44 and C31 Melbourne, Fifield again extended the deadline for an additional 12 months to 30 June 2021.

In June 2021, Channel 44 Adelaide and C31 Melbourne were given a three-year extension, thanks to amendments tabled by South Australian Senator Rex Patrick.

Video on Demand

In 2017, Brisbane's 31 Digital attempted a video on demand service called Queensland Online TV, but was unsuccessful and the service went offline within a year. A second attempt, re-branded as Hitchhike TV was created in 2018 streaming linear programming in short blocks from their website. However, this service was also unsuccessful and went offline in 2020. Newcastle station Hunter TV and Perth station West TV ceased free-to-air transmissions in 2017 and 2020 respectively, but have both attempted video-on-demand presences on Youtube and from their websites.

On 12 August 2021, both C31 Melbourne and 44 Adelaide together with Film Victoria launched a new online streaming service, CTV+. The CTV+ platform allows viewers to stream both channels linearly, or watch programmes on demand. An app for mobile devices, CTV+ was launched in August 2022.

Licensing
Australia has a special type of broadcasting licence for community television which is available via free-to-air terrestrial reception. Holders of a community television licence must conform to various rules, primarily relating to advertising and to a lesser extent, program content. They are licensed by, and regulated by, the Australian Communications and Media Authority (ACMA).

In the strictest sense of the term, Australian community television is the officially licensed stations and their programming. However, there are a number of stations and distributors that release similar content - but they are not subject to government regulation.

Community support
Some community television programs are made by amateurs volunteering their skills to produce programs about their own communities and special and diverse interests. In other cases, not-for-profit organisations and independent content creators produce programs. The sector is represented by the Australian Community Television Alliance.

Community television is funded by a mixture of sponsorship, subscriptions and donations, membership fees, grants, and merchandise sales. It receives no regular national government funding. Many programs are paid for by the producers themselves.

The Antenna Awards, recognising outstanding community television programs, were established in 2004 and were awarded annually until 2010. They are traditionally hosted at a gala awards ceremony at Federation Square in Melbourne by C31 Melbourne, and have been revived twice – once in 2014, and again in 2019.The 2021 Antenna Awards were postponed a number of times and eventually held online with the iconic statuette being awarded to over 20 recipients.

A special emphasis of community television is the provision of programs in an increasing range of community languages and about community cultures. Over twenty languages groups, many from newly migrant and refugee communities, are broadcast regularly by the community television stations. Australian Community Television producers are often also producers of other community media, such as the Student Youth Network.

Stations

Defunct stations

Programs
Many original television programs have been created by community television stations. These are often broadcast on stations in other states, and sometimes transfer later to   pay television or free-to-air. Programs include:

1700
The Bazura Project
Blokesworld
Darren & Brose
The Darren Sanders Show
Eastern Newsbeat
Fishcam
Hot Dog with the Lot
In Pit Lane
KO Boxing
Level 3
Live on Bowen
The Marngrook Footy Show
Planet Nerd
Raucous
Russian Kaleidoscope
Salam Cafe
Studio A
Under Melbourne Tonight
Vasili's Garden
What's Goin' On There?
Whose Shout

References

See also
 Amateur television
 Citizen media
 Citizen journalism
 Community media
 Community radio
 Public-access television

Australian community television